Augustyniak is a surname. Notable people with the surname include:

 Benedykt Augustyniak (born 1932), Polish rower
 Jerry Augustyniak (born 1958), American drummer
 Julie Augustyniak (born 1979), American soccer player
 Nancy Augustyniak Goffi (born 1979), American soccer player